is a 1996 competitive scrolling shooter arcade game originally created by ADK. It was ADK's last production for the Neo Geo platform. The gameplay, which can be characterized as a combination of a fixed shooter and a versus puzzle game, uses combinations of shots, as well as timed power-ups to attempt to damage the opponent. These attacks also serve as counters to the opponent's attack.

Gameplay 

There are two types of standard attacks: a normal shot and a charge-up shot. Each character starts with two bombs, which clean the screen while briefly granting the player invincibility. The two players' playfields are separated by a vertical bar; each playfield is independent of the other. Series of enemies arrive from the top of the screen. The player must destroy them in chains (combos), which will send one or more fireball projectiles the opponent's screen (Normal Attack). Shooting a Normal Attack several times reflects it back as a glowing Reverse Attack. If Reverse Attacks are reflected again, a number of powerful counterattacks in the shape of one or more indestructible enemies appear (Extra Attack). Reflecting many Reverse Attacks at once can instead summon a boss (Boss Attack).
The Extra Attacks and the Boss Attack vary from one character to another.
The power gauge fills as the player destroys enemies, up to a maximum of three levels. By holding down the fire button and releasing when a certain level is reached, the player can launch a character-specific charge shot to assist in clearing enemies from the player's screen. At Level 1, the charge shot is launched. At Level 2, the charge shot and three Extra Attacks against the opponent are launched. At Level 3 (Max Level), the charge shot and a Boss Attack are launched. Firing charge shots at Level 2 and above will decrease the power gauge.
30–40 seconds into a round, a blue orb appears among a chain of enemies. If this orb is destroyed in a chain, the player achieves Fever status for the next several seconds. Chains created during Fever generate faster and more plentiful Normal Attacks per enemy destroyed, which can prove to be very dangerous to the opponent if large chains are made.
Both players are given five life points at the start of a round.
Colliding into an enemy costs one life point, but the player cannot be killed this way; if a player has one life point left, colliding with an enemy will reduce the player's health to one half of a life point. When this happens, the player's character is stunned for a short while and is reduced in speed and attack power for several seconds after recovery, all while left more vulnerable to opponent attacks.
Getting hit by a Normal Attack, Reverse Attack, Extra Attack or the projectiles from a Boss cost three life points.
The match is over when either player loses all life points.
When a player takes damage, the opponent recovers life points equal to half of the damage taken.
If a round lasts longer than 100 seconds or the player does not fire a shot for more than 30 seconds, a Death enemy appears. A player hit by this enemy loses immediately (Death Attack). The Death can be destroyed as any other enemy, but always comes back, harder to kill. Additionally, if a player is successful in volleying the Death character over to the opponent's side, and Death touches the opponent, the opponent dies instantly. This is a possible, though difficult, way to win. This, of course, would require the player to be skilled enough to avoid obstacles and not fire for more than 30 seconds.

Development 

Twinkle Star Sprites was developed by ADK.

Release 
While Twinkle Star Sprites was initially published as an arcade game by SNK for the Neo Geo platform, SNK later ported it to the Neo-Geo AES home console on January 31, 1997, and the Neo-Geo CD on February 21, 1997.  On December 7, 1997, ADK developed and published an updated version of it to the Sega Saturn, featuring an anime-style intro, tweaked gameplay, a new character and a bonus 'Fan Disc' full of extra materials. After SNK ended up buying ADK's intellectual properties, SNK released another enhanced version of Twinkle Star Sprites for the Sega Dreamcast on March 23, 2000. To pay tribute to ADK, SNK included the Neo-Geo version along with four of ADK's other notable Neo-Geo titles in the compilation ADK Damashii, which was released for the PlayStation 2 exclusively in Japan on December 8, 2008. Twinkle Star Sprites later became available on the subscription service GameTap. It was released on the Wii Virtual Console for Japan on August 9, 2011.

A port developed by DotEmu for Microsoft Windows, OS X, Linux and asm.js was released as part of the Humble NEOGEO 25th Anniversary Bundle on December 8, 2015. It was released on Steam on May 26, 2016; and on GOG.com on May 30, 2017.

Pony Canyon / Scitron released a limited-edition soundtrack album for this game on February 21, 1997.

Reception 

In Japan, Game Machine listed Twinkle Star Sprites on their January 1, 1997 issue as being the fourteenth most-popular arcade game at the time. The game received generally mixed reception from critics since its release in arcades and other platforms. However, fan reception was positive; Readers of the Japanese Sega Saturn Magazine voted to give the Saturn port a 8.85 out of 10 score, ranking at the number 118 spot, indicating a large popular following. Readers of the Japanese Dreamcast Magazine also voted to give the Dreamcast port a 7.58 out of 10 score, ranking at the number 307 spot, indicating a popular following as well.

Both AllGames Kyle Knight praised the audiovisual presentation and frantic gameplay, stating that Twinkle Star Sprites is "a refreshingly innovative title that manages to pull its seemingly incompatible elements together brilliantly." However, Knight criticized the amount of slowdown when too many objects are present on-screen. Consoles Plus François Garnier also praised the presentation, visuals, animations, audio, longevity and playability. IGNs Colin Williamson reviewed the Dreamcast conversion, commending the addition of extra options in the release and multiplayer mode but criticized the low-resolution graphics and stated that playing single-player modes were not appealing in a long-term.

However, Joypads Grégoire Hellot reviewed the Sega Saturn version and gave the title an overall mixed outlook. In a similar manner, Video Games Ralph Karels also gave the Dreamcast port a mixed overview, commending the unconventional gameplay but criticized the audio and visuals when compared to other shoot 'em ups on the Dreamcast.

Sequel
 is a 2005 sequel to Twinkle Star Sprites originally created by SNK. At E3 2005, it was shown at the SNK Booth. It is an enhanced re-vamp of the Neo-Geo title featuring fully 3D environments and a host of new characters. Clearing the game opens up a perfectly emulated version of the original Neo-Geo title. There was a possibility that it would be released in North America, but after some consideration, at E3 2006, Ben Herman, president of SNK Playmore USA, stated that the game will not be published in North America   The decision was that it will not be marketable for the North American audience.  The sequel was released exclusively in Japan for the PlayStation 2 on July 28, 2005, and was re-released for the same platform on November 22, 2006, with the green-label 'SNK Best Collection' added to the front cover. Content remains the same as the original print.

Notes

References

External links 
 Twinkle Star Sprites at GameFAQs
 Twinkle Star Sprites at Giant Bomb
 Twinkle Star Sprites at Killer List of Videogames
 Twinkle Star Sprites at MobyGames

1996 video games
ACA Neo Geo games
ADK (company) games
Arcade video games
D4 Enterprise games
Dreamcast games
Linux games
MacOS games
Neo Geo games
Neo Geo CD games
Nintendo Switch games
Now Production games
PlayStation Network games
PlayStation 4 games
Rutubo Games games
Sega Saturn games
Multiplayer and single-player video games
Scrolling shooters
SNK franchises
SNK Playmore games
Vertically scrolling shooters
Video games developed in Japan
Video games scored by Hideki Yamamoto
Video games scored by Hiroaki Kujirai
Video games scored by Hiroaki Shimizu
Video games scored by Keiichiro Segawa
Video games scored by Takao Oshima
Video games scored by Takeshi Muramatsu
Video games scored by Yuka Watanabe
Virtual Console games
Windows games
Xbox One games
Hamster Corporation games